Pylon Field was a small airport located in southwest Arlington, Texas, United States.  The 1,800-foot runway was originally built in 1960.  The airport was closed in 1975.

The former location of the airport runway is now the parking lot for the baseball fields at Martin High School in Arlington.

External links
  Entry at Abandoned & Little Known Airfields in Texas on Pylon Field

Airports in Texas